David Llewellin (born 3 May 1960) is a Welsh rally driver. He was highly successful in the British Rally Championship, winning the title twice in 1989 and 1990, both times at the wheel of a Toyota Celica GT-Four. In the European Rally Championship for drivers, he finished third in 1987, while his highest placing in the World Rally Championship was 36th in 1987.

Llewellin was born in Haverfordwest. In the course of his career, Llewellin drove for a number of different teams reaching a pinnacle during his time with the Toyota team.

Llewellin's son, Ben Llewellin, is a sports shooter who won a silver medal for Wales in the skeet event at the 2018 Commonwealth Games.

References

External links
 Rallybase Data page

Living people
Welsh rally drivers
1960 births
World Rally Championship drivers
Audi Sport drivers
Nismo drivers